Albert Iremonger (15 June 1884 – 9 March 1958) was a football goalkeeper, county-class cricketer and brother of sportsmen Harry Iremonger and James Iremonger.

Early life
Albert Iremonger was born in Wilford, Nottinghamshire on 15 June 1884. He was the younger brother of James Iremonger and older brother of Harry Iremonger.

Footballing career 
Although Iremonger never played at an international level, he was widely regarded as one of the best goalkeepers of his time and is a local legend in his home county of Nottinghamshire. It is also believed Iremonger was the tallest player in the league at the time, measuring 6 ft  5in.

Notts County 
Albert Iremonger signed for Notts County from local minnows Notts Jardines, making his debut against Sheffield Wednesday on 1 April 1905. In total he made 564 appearances for the club making 211 consecutive appearances and holds the club record for this. Spending 21 years with the club, he totalled 37 FA Cup appearances over 22 seasons before leaving the club to join Lincoln City.

His exceptional performances for the club earned him a Football League cap in 1912. As a testament to his character and legendary status within the community, a road behind the club's ground was named for him. It is still said amongst Notts County fans that he had "hands like the claws of a JCB".

Lincoln City
Albert Iremonger signed for Lincoln City aged 42, becoming their oldest ever player. Although he was a short-term signing, he made 35 appearances for the club from 1926 to 1927.

Temperament 
Iremonger was well noted for his outspoken nature on the football pitch, which led to the end of his 211 consecutive appearances for Notts County. He would often leave his goal-mouth to argue decisions made by match officials sometimes situated in the centre of the pitch.

Cricketing career 
Iremonger played county cricket for Nottinghamshire, his career spanning between 1906 and 1910. He played with a right-handed batting and bowling style.

Children 
Albert Iremonger and his wife Margaret Iremonger fathered Albert Harvey Iremonger in 1920, who went on to become a Sergeant-Pilot in the RAF. He was killed in action on 14 July 1943, aged 23.

Later life
Much later on in his life, during the 1940s, Iremonger was the landlord of the Cremorne in The Meadows Nottingham and later The Ferry Inn Wilford before his death on 9 March 1958.

References

External links 
Iremonger's cricketing career statistics

1884 births
1958 deaths
Association football goalkeepers
English cricketers
Nottinghamshire cricketers
English footballers
People from Nottingham (district)
Cricketers from Nottinghamshire
Jardine's Athletic F.C. players
Notts County F.C. players
Lincoln City F.C. players
English Football League players
English Football League representative players
Footballers from Nottinghamshire